Troy Rassmussen Dandridge (April 22, 1904 – April 12, 1993) was an American Negro league shortstop in the 1920s.

A native of Lucy, Tennessee, Dandridge played for the Dayton Marcos in 1926. He died in Los Angeles, California in 1993 at age 88.

References

External links
 and Seamheads

1904 births
1993 deaths
Dayton Marcos players
20th-century African-American sportspeople